Vejlby is a north-eastern neighbourhood of Aarhus in Denmark. It is located 5km from the city centre and is administratively part of the district of Risskov. 

The neighbourhood of Vejlby was administratively merged with Risskov at the end of the 20th century and as a consequence, the district is often seen referred to as Vejlby-Risskov nowadays. There are several other places named Vejlby in Denmark, like the small village in the vicinity of Grenå on Mols, featured in the acclaimed novella "The Rector of Veilbye" by Steen Steensen Blicher.

Once a village and a suburb, Vejlby has now completely merged with the city of Aarhus, but can still present areas characterised by the old village around the old church and graveyard. Modern buildings of note, are the shopping mall of Veri Center, the dormitory of Børglum Kollegiet with its notable architecture, a nursing and retirement centre, the large sports complex of Vejlby-Risskov Idrætscenter, the large residential areas of Veriparken, Næringen & Nyringen and Kantorparken. Important educational buildings comprise the Risskov Gymnasium (STX) and Handelsgymnasiet Vejlby (HHX). The only notable green area in Vejlby is Mollerup Skov.

Gallery
Landmarks and institutions

Residential buildings

Neighborhoods of Aarhus
Aarhus N